is a 2017 Japanese drama film directed by Naoko Ogigami. Ogigami wrote the script after a visit to the United States caused her to become more aware of LGBT issues. The film follows Tomo Ogawa, an 11-year-old girl, who becomes close to her uncle's transgender girlfriend after Tomo's mother, who has been raising her alone, unexpectedly runs off and leaves Tomo behind. It was screened in the Panorama section at the 67th Berlin International Film Festival.

Plot
Tomo Ogawa is a neglected 11-year-old girl. She lives with her single and irresponsible mother in a small apartment, who abandons her when she falls in love with a new man. Whenever that happens, Tomo goes to live with her uncle, Makio. However, this time around, Makio is cohabitating with his girlfriend, Rinko, who is a transgender woman. The film portrays the drama that unfolds in an unconventional family and Tomo's acceptance of LGBT people.

Cast
 Toma Ikuta as Rinko
 Kenta Kiritani as Makio Ogawa
 Rinka Kakihara as Tomo Ogawa
 Rie Mimura as Hiromi Ogawa
 Eiko Koike as Naomi
 Mugi Kadowaki as Yuka
 Shuji Kashiwabara as Yoshio
 Kaito Komie as Kai
 Lily as Sayuri Ogawa
 Misako Tanaka as Fumiko
 Noriko Eguchi as Kanai
 Tōru Shinagawa as Saito

See also
 List of LGBT-related films directed by women

References

External links
 
 Close-Knit at Japanese Film Database

2017 films
2017 drama films
2017 LGBT-related films
Japanese drama films
2010s Japanese-language films
Japanese LGBT-related films
Films about trans women
LGBT-related drama films
Films directed by Naoko Ogigami
2010s Japanese films